Greene County Courthouse is a historic courthouse building located at Bloomfield, Greene County, Indiana.  It was designed by noted Indianapolis architect George W. Bunting and built in 1885–1886.  It is a three-story, rectangular, Classical Revival style brick and stone building. It measures approximately 112 feet by 77 feet.  The building has lost its original tower and corner turrets.

It was listed on the National Register of Historic Places in 2008.

References

County courthouses in Indiana
Courthouses on the National Register of Historic Places in Indiana
Neoclassical architecture in Indiana
Government buildings completed in 1886
Buildings and structures in Greene County, Indiana
National Register of Historic Places in Greene County, Indiana